Méagui Department is a department of Nawa Region in Bas-Sassandra District, Ivory Coast. In 2021, its population was 299,251 and its seat is the settlement of Méagui. The sub-prefectures of the department are Gnanmangui, Méagui and Oupoyo.

History
Méagui Department and Buyo Department were created in 2012 by dividing Soubré Department.

Notes

States and territories established in 2012
2012 establishments in Ivory Coast
Departments of Nawa Region